Maso is a genus of dwarf spiders that was first described by Eugène Louis Simon in 1884.

Species
 it contains seven species:
Maso alticeps (Emerton, 1909) – USA
Maso douro Bosmans & Cardoso, 2010 – Portugal
Maso gallicus Simon, 1894 – Europe, Algeria to Azerbaijan
Maso krakatauensis Bristowe, 1931 – Indonesia (Krakatau)
Maso navajo Chamberlin, 1949 – USA
Maso politus Banks, 1896 – USA
Maso sundevalli (Westring, 1851) (type) – North America, Europe, Turkey, Caucasus, Russia (Europe to Far East), China, Mongolia, Japan

See also
 List of Linyphiidae species (I–P)

References

Araneomorphae genera
Linyphiidae
Spiders of Asia
Spiders of North America